The following is a list of ecoregions in Western Sahara, according to the Worldwide Fund for Nature (WWF).

Terrestrial ecoregions

Palearctic

Mediterranean forests, woodlands, and scrub
 Mediterranean acacia-argania dry woodlands and succulent thickets

Deserts and xeric shrublands
 Atlantic coastal desert
 North Saharan steppe and woodlands

Freshwater ecoregions
 Dry Sahel
 Permanent Maghreb
 Temporary Maghreb

Marine ecoregions
 Saharan Upwelling

References
 Burgess, Neil, Jennifer D’Amico Hales, Emma Underwood (2004). Terrestrial Ecoregions of Africa and Madagascar: A Conservation Assessment. Island Press, Washington DC.
 Spalding, Mark D., Helen E. Fox, Gerald R. Allen, Nick Davidson et al. "Marine Ecoregions of the World: A Bioregionalization of Coastal and Shelf Areas". Bioscience Vol. 57 No. 7, July/August 2007, pp. 573-583.
 Thieme, Michelle L. (2005). Freshwater Ecoregions of Africa and Madagascar: A Conservation Assessment. Island Press, Washington DC.

 
Western Sahara
Ecoregions